Great God may refer to:
 God in monotheism
 King of the gods in polytheism 
 , a Japanese video game first released in 2006

See also
 Great Goddess